Novyy Island is the larger and southern island of two similar ice covered features that serve to delimit the Jelbart and Fimbul Ice Shelves, on the coast of Queen Maud Land. The summit of this feature rises about 250 m above the surrounding ice shelf. The island was partly delineated by the Norwegian Antarctic Expedition, 1956–60. It was mapped by the Soviet Antarctic Expedition in 1961 and named "Kupol Novyy" (new dome).

See also 
 List of antarctic and sub-antarctic islands

Islands of Queen Maud Land
Princess Martha Coast